The green-and-black poison dart frog (Dendrobates auratus), also known as the green-and-black poison arrow frog and green poison frog (among others), is a brightly colored member of the order Anura native to Central America and northwestern parts of South America. This species has also been introduced to Hawaii. It is one of the most variable of all poison dart frogs next to Dendrobates tinctorius and some Oophaga spp.  It is considered to be of least concern from a conservation standpoint by the International Union for Conservation of Nature.

Description
The green-and-black poison dart frog has the typical appearance of the members of its family. Males average , while females are slightly larger, averaging an inch or longer.  The green-and-black poison frog typically has mint-green coloration; however, this pigment can also be forest, lime, emerald green, turquoise, or even cobalt blue or pale yellow.  Mixed with this typically green are splotches of dark color, ranging from wood brown to black.  The green-and-black poison dart frog is one of the most variable of all poison frogs in appearance; some have black or brown splotches, others are dappled, or have "splashes" of black, like Oophaga sylvaticus.

Distribution
The green-and-black poison dart frog is found in the humid lowlands from southeastern Nicaragua on the Atlantic slope and southeastern Costa Rica on the Pacific coast through Panama to northwestern Colombia (Chocó Department). An introduced populations exist on Oahu; the species was purposefully introduced there in 1932 for mosquito control. Later on, it seems to have also become established on Maui.

Poison
The green-and-black poison dart frog, while not the most toxic poison dart frog, is still a highly toxic animal.  The very small amount of poison the frog possesses is enough to make a human heart stop beating.  However, like most poison dart frogs, the green-and-black poison dart frog only releases its poison if it feels threatened, and wild specimens can be handled provided the human holding it is calm and relaxed.  The green-and-black poison dart frog, as with all poison dart frogs, loses its toxicity in captivity due to a change in diet.  This has led some scientists to believe that the green-and-black poison frog actually takes its poison from the mites and other insects on which it feeds.

Behavior
The green-and-black poison dart frog is semi arboreal, hunting, courting, and sleeping in the trees.  However, as it is a small frog, it cannot jump far enough to span the distances between trees, so it returns to the ground when it wants to travel.  To assist in climbing, the frog has small, sucker-like discs on the ends of its toes, which create a slight suction as the frogs climb, making their grip mildly adhesive.

Reproduction
Unlike all other poison dart frogs, green-and-black poison dart frogs gather in large groups before mating.  They squabble over territories; eventually, each individual male frog clears a small patch for himself.  Females wander among the males, with the latter then attempting to impress the former with their bird-like mating calls.  Once a male has caught the attention of a female, he leads her to a site he has selected for egg deposition.  The female lays her eggs, which he then fertilizes.  In about 14 days, these hatch into tadpoles. Their parents, typically the male, then carry the tadpoles into the canopy, with the tadpoles sticking to the mucus on their parents' backs.  The parents then deposit their tadpoles into the small pools of water that accumulate in the center of bromeliads, and guard the tadpoles while they feed on algae and small invertebrates that inhabit the tiny pool.

As pets

Green-and-black poison dart frogs are popular exotic pets due to their small size, bright colors, and intriguing behavior.  As with all frogs, they have permeable skin and should not be handled.

References

Dendrobates
Amphibians of Central America
Amphibians described in 1855
Amphibians of Colombia
Amphibians of Costa Rica
Amphibians of Nicaragua
Amphibians of Panama
Introduced animals of Hawaii
Taxa named by Charles Frédéric Girard